"Terrified" is a song by American rapper and singer Childish Gambino from his third studio album "Awaken, My Love!". It was sent to urban contemporary radio as the album's third single on September 19, 2017.

Live performances
"Terrified" was performed live by Gambino and McCrary at the 60th Annual Grammy Awards.

Personnel
Credits adapted from the album's liner notes.

Childish Gambino – lead and backing vocals, glockenspiel
Ludwig Göransson – background vocals, guitar, drum programming, synth programming
Per Gunnar Juliusson – fender Rhodes
JD McCrary – guest vocals
Zac Rae – moog synthesizer, B3 organ
Ray Suen – guitar

Charts

Release history

References

External links

2017 singles
2016 songs
Glassnote Records singles
Songs written by Ludwig Göransson
Songs written by Donald Glover